The 1949 New York Giants season was the franchise's 67th season. The team finished in fifth place in the National League with a 73–81 record, 24 games behind the Brooklyn Dodgers. The games were now broadcast on the then new station WPIX-TV, which was launched the year before.

Offseason 
 Prior to 1949 season (exact date unknown)
Art Fowler was acquired from the Giants by the Atlanta Crackers.
Foster Castleman was signed as an amateur free agent by the Giants.

Regular season

Season standings

Record vs. opponents

Opening Day lineup

Roster

Player stats

Batting

Starters by position 
Note: Pos = Position; G = Games played; AB = At bats; H = Hits; Avg. = Batting average; HR = Home runs; RBI = Runs batted in

Other batters 
Note: G = Games played; AB = At bats; H = Hits; Avg. = Batting average; HR = Home runs; RBI = Runs batted in

Pitching

Starting pitchers 
Note: G = Games pitched; IP = Innings pitched; W = Wins; L = Losses; ERA = Earned run average; SO = Strikeouts

Other pitchers 
Note: G = Games pitched; IP = Innings pitched; W = Wins; L = Losses; ERA = Earned run average; SO = Strikeouts

Relief pitchers 
Note: G = Games pitched; W = Wins; L = Losses; SV = Saves; ERA = Earned run average; SO = Strikeouts

Farm system 

LEAGUE CHAMPIONS: Trenton, Lawton, Oshkosh

Notes

References 
 1949 New York Giants at Baseball Reference
 1949 New York Giants at Baseball Almanac

New York Giants (NL)
San Francisco Giants seasons
New York Giants season
New York Giants MLB
1940s in Manhattan
Washington Heights, Manhattan